LITE-1 is a novel photoreceptor found in Caenorhabditis elegans. It exhibits blue light photoreceptor activity. Is involved in several processes, including negative phototaxis, phototransduction, and response to UV light. Many organisms have photosensitive proteins, yet only two types of photoreceptors, opsins and cryptochromes, have been discovered in metazoans until LITE-1. This photoreceptor is much more efficient at absorbing both ultraviolet light, 10 to 100 times greater than the two other types found in the animal kingdom.

References 

Caenorhabditis elegans genes
Photoreceptor cells